Oktay Ahmedov Hamdiev (born 24 July 2000) is a Bulgarian footballer who plays as a winger for Bulgarian First League club Hebar Pazardzhik.

Club career
Hamdiev spent his youth years at the academy of Septemvri Sofia from 2016 to 2018. On 25 Septemvri 2018, he made his debut for the team against Septemvri Sofia.

In Juny 2019, he joined Hebar Pazardzhik.

References

External links

2000 births
Living people
Sportspeople from Bjelovar
Bulgarian footballers
Association football midfielders
FC Hebar Pazardzhik players
First Professional Football League (Bulgaria) players